The ATR 72 is a twin-engine turboprop, short-haul regional airliner developed and produced in France and Italy by aircraft manufacturer ATR (Aerei da Trasporto Regionale or Avions de transport régional), a joint venture formed by French aerospace company Aérospatiale (now Airbus) and Italian aviation conglomerate Aeritalia (now Leonardo S.p.A.). The number "72" in its name is derived from the aircraft's standard seating configuration in a passenger-carrying configuration, which could seat 72–78 passengers in a single-class arrangement.

Airline operators 
As of July 2019, 775 ATR 72s were in airline service, with a further 171 on order.

Government operators 

 Algeria
 Algerian Air Force - used for VIP transport

 Italy
 Italian Air Force - ASW and maritime patrol 
 Guardia di Finanza - maritime patrol

 Pakistan
 Pakistan Navy (Pakistan Naval Air Arm) - maritime patrol

 Thailand
 Royal Thai Air Force - VIP/transport

 Turkey
 Turkish Navy - ASW/maritime patrol and transport

Former operators

References

72
Cargo aircraft
1980s international airliners
Twin-turboprop tractor aircraft